The open-geomorphometry project is a 2012 open source computer code project created for the public availability of geomorphometry code. This code, written by Dr. Bob MacMillan, is known amongst its primary users as LandMapR (LandMapR has since become a copyrighted term in the U.S. for an agricultural remote sensing device).  LandMapR, and the new open-geomorphometry project, operate digital elevation data to produce maps including but not limited to: hydrological flow, catchments, depression or pits, water pooling, wetness index, topographic derivatives, and landform classifications.

Origin
LandMapR performs a number of operations on Digital Elevation Models (DEMs), from calculating hydrological flow directions, water pooling, to performing sophisticated topographical landform classifications (see for example Jensen et al., (1988), or O'Callaghan et al., (1984) and references therein).  LandMapR is an all-in-one tool for extracting information from DEMs.  The initial version of the software was written by Dr. Bob MacMillan as part of his Ph.D. thesis at the University of Edinburgh in 1993, and was coded in a Microsoft Rapid Application Development language called FoxPro.  The FoxPro version exists to today, but is not part of the open source effort due to its restriction as an interpreted language.  The open-geomorphometry project makes the much faster C++ version of the software available.

Functions
The most unusual aspects of LandMapR and the open-geomorphometry project are the algorithms it implements to conduct 'pit' removal.  Pits are depressions in the topography.  Pits are usually seen as interfering with the flow.  Typical pit removal (for example see Jensen et al. (1988)) involves simply removing depressions from DEMs in order to resolve flow paths.  LandMapR also conducts these operations on 'spurious' pits, but goes beyond normal pit removal procedures to treat watersheds, which are depressions, as a potential heirachichal path for flows and figures out how one pit might flow into another to produce new flow channels in a field.

The applications for this kind of pit-removal are almost unlimited.  Water and cold air pooling in vineyards and farm fields represent a serious issue in generating high yield crops.  For example, a farm field has recently been fertilized with granular heavy phosphorus fertilizer.  Knowing the distribution density of this fertilizer across the field it is possible to use pit removal to calculated the area to flow calculations as well as the potential residence times that would enable an estimate of how much rain is required to carry that fertilizer off into local streams.  The area to flow capability of the pit removal calculations in LandMapR are unique.

The open-source open-geomorphometry project forms the basis, or the geomorphology part, of some of the work being documented on the Phytogeomorphology page, and is the chosen software tool for much of that work.

Hydrology

LandMapR as a hydrological tool performs a number of useful operations on DEMs.  Within LandMapR are a number of distinct operations.  The original code had 19 operators that could be applied sequentially to the datasets.  The newer versions in the open source project break the tasks into four areas; flow calculations, pit removal (catchment hydrology), facets (landform derivatives), and form (landform derivatives).  Each section has a sequence of output maps.  Currently, the flow and pit removal calculations result in 5 major maps: flow direction, upslope contribution/area, watersheds, volume to flood, and millimeters to flood, and several minor maps that show the stages of pit removal.

Landform Classification

In the limited context of a landform being a component of a farm field topography, LandMapR is used to compute surface derivatives and other topological values, as well as using fuzzy logic to divide a farm field into a collection of landform classes.  LandMapR is capable of defining a large number of landform classes and allowing the user to define criterion for membership in each of these classes.

References

External links
Open-geomorphometry project homepage at Code.Google.com

Geomorphology
Hydrology
Topography techniques